Lachnus is a genus of aphids and the name-bearing type genus of the subfamily Lachninae. It consists of about 20 species.

References

Further reading

 
 

Taxa named by Hermann Burmeister
Lachninae
Sternorrhyncha genera